Magnus Holte (born 27 March 2006) is a Norwegian footballer who plays for Norwegian club Rosenborg.

Club career

Holte signed for Rosenborg from Nardo in 2021. In August 2022 he signed his first professional contract.  On 18 September 2022, Holte made his league debut in a 3-1 win over Lillestrøm coming on as a substitute. Doing so he became the youngest player to play for Rosenborg in a league match with 16 years and 175 days, beating the record of John Hou Sæter.  A record that under 2 months later was broken by his teammate Sverre Nypan.

Career statistics

Club

References

External links
 

2006 births
Living people
Norwegian footballers
Association football forwards
Rosenborg BK players
Eliteserien players